Jackson Central-Merry Middle and High School also known as (JCMMS, JCMHS, JCM 6-12 or JCM) is both a middle school and high school located in Jackson, Tennessee, United States. The school was active as a high school from 1970 to 2016, during which time it was once the largest in West Tennessee outside Memphis. The school was renovated and reopened as a middle and high school on September 20, 2021.

History
The school was formed in 1970 as a consolidation of predominantly white Jackson High School and predominantly black Merry High School. It was the first integrated high school in Jackson. The former Jackson High became the new school's "west campus" and the former Merry High became the "east campus."  The school initially taught students in grades 10, 11 and 12.  Freshmen students were added after the Jackson city school system consolidated with the Madison County system in the early 1990s.

Three city junior high schools (later middle schools) originally fed into JCM: Tigrett Junior High School, Jackson Junior High School and Parkway Junior High School.  The school mascot was the Cougar.  School colors were green and gold.

In 2003, the west campus became Madison Academic Magnet High School.  Jackson Central-Merry was then entirely housed on the former east campus.  Oman Arena is located between both campuses.

In 2016, Jackson-Madison County School Board of Education issued the "Vision 2020" plan. This plan was passed, as a result, Jackson Central-Merry High School was closed along with 4 other schools.

In 2021, Jackson-Madison County Schools renovated and reopened the school as a middle and high school holding grades 6–12 in the fall.

Jackson Central-Merry Academy of Medical Technology Magnet High School

JCM was awarded the High School Redesign Grant, which provided $1.5 million over a three-year period to create the Jackson Central-Merry Academy of Medical Technology Magnet High School program, which was completed in 2010.

Beginning in the 2010–2011 school year, Jackson Central-Merry High School began offering a health science magnet school program.  The program was intended to help incoming freshmen become certified in a healthcare related area upon the completion of high school.

The program curriculum focused on advancing one of four fields of study:

 Therapeutic Services (Certified in Nursing assistant)
 Diagnostic Services (Certified in phlebotomy with clinical internship)
 Health Informatics
 Biotechnology Research and Development

In December, 2015, the Jackson-Madison County School Board voted to close JCM after the 2015–2016 academic year.  Upon its 2016 closure, the school had graduated 46 senior classes over as many academic years. In 2019, the Board began discussions to renovate and reopen the school. JCM reopened in 2021 holding grades 6 to 11. The mascot and school colors remained as originally implemented.

Notable alumni
Artis Hicks —— former professional football player
Ed Jones — former professional football player (graduated from Merry High, not JCM)
Van Jones — political activist, former Obama Administration staff member
Matt Kisber — businessman and Democratic politician
Al Wilson — former professional football player
Jackie Beard — former U.S. national amateur bantamweight boxing champion (1978–80)

References

Public high schools in Tennessee
Schools in Madison County, Tennessee
Jackson, Tennessee
Magnet schools in Tennessee